Zoology journal may refer to one of the following:

A
 Animal Biology, formerly Netherlands Journal of Zoology
 Australian Journal of Zoology

C
 Canadian Journal of Zoology
 Contributions to Zoology (Bijdragen tot de Dierkunde)

I
 Integrative and Comparative Biology, formerly American Zoologist

J
 Journal of Experimental Zoology
 Journal of Zoology
 Journal of Zoological Systematics and Evolutionary Research

N
 New Zealand Journal of Zoology
 North-Western Journal of Zoology

Z
 The Zoological Journal
 Zoological Journal of the Linnean Society
 Zoology (journal)

See also
 List of zoology journals